Xyloperthini is a tribe of horned powder-post beetles in the family Bostrichidae. There are more than 30 genera and 140 described species in Xyloperthini.

Genera
These 34 genera belong to the tribe Xyloperthini:

 Amintinus Anonymous, 1939
 Calonistes Lesne, 1936
 Calophagus Lesne, 1902
 Ctenobostrychus Reichardt, 1962
 Dendrobiella Casey, 1898
 Enneadesmus Mulsant, 1851
 Mesoxylion Vrydagh, 1955
 Octodesmus Lesne, 1901
 Paraxylion Lesne, 1941
 Paraxylogenes Damoisseau, 1968
 Plioxylion Vrydagh, 1955
 Psicula Lesne, 1941
 Scobicia Lesne, 1901
 Sifidius Borowski & Wegrzynowicz, 2007
 Tetrapriocera Horn, 1878
 Xylion Lesne, 1901
 Xylionopsis Lesne, 1937
 Xylionulus Lesne, 1901
 Xylobiops Casey, 1898
 Xyloblaptus Lesne, 1901
 Xylobosca Lesne, 1901
 Xylocis Lesne, 1901
 Xylodectes Lesne, 1901
 Xylodeleis Lesne, 1901
 Xylodrypta Lesne, 1901
 Xylogenes Lesne, 1901
 Xylomeira Lesne, 1901
 Xylopertha Guérin-Méneville, 1845
 Xyloperthella Fisher, 1950
 Xylophorus Lesne, 1906
 Xyloprista Lesne, 1901
 Xylopsocus Lesne, 1901
 Xylothrips Lesne, 1901
 Xylotillus Lesne, 1901

References

Further reading

External links

 

Bostrichidae
Articles created by Qbugbot